Jim Kitchen (born August 15, 1964) is an American entrepreneur and professor. He is the first person to travel to all 193 United Nations recognized countries and to space. Kitchen is a Professor of the Practice of Strategy and Entrepreneurship at UNC Kenan-Flagler Business School.

Career 
Jim Kitchen started his first business in 1985, a marketing business, and promoted low-earth orbit space trips. Afterwards, he started an international tour business as well as several other companies He was instrumental in developing Chapel Hill’s entrepreneurship eco-system, opening up accelerator Launch Chapel Hill and student incubator 1789 Venture Lab.

Kitchen began teaching Entrepreneurship at UNC’s Kenan-Flagler Business School in 2010. The central theme of Kitchen’s course is teaching students to create profits with a purpose. In his course students learn entrepreneurial principles by starting small businesses where profits are donated to non-profits, including Make a Wish and other charities. Kitchen’s classes have given away multiple cars to people transitioning out of homelessness.

Travel career 
Kitchen began traveling internationally in high school and over the past 30 years has visited all 193 countries recognized by the United Nations. He visited his 193rd country, Syria, in 2019. Kitchen is a member of the Travelers' Century Club, recognized as a Gold Member for visiting 100 or more countries.

Space flight 
On March 14, 2022, Blue Origin announced that Jim Kitchen would be a member of the NS-20 mission. Pete Davidson was scheduled to be a crew member on this launch, however Davidson changed his mind. Gary Lai, the chief architect of the New Shepard rocket system replaced Pete Davidson on this space flight. On March 31, 2022, Kitchen became the first person to travel to all 193 U.N. recognized countries and go to space. Several news outlets referred to him as the “Modern Day Marco Polo” who went to space.

References 

Living people
University of North Carolina at Chapel Hill people
1964 births